Men Seeking Women is a 1997 American comedy film written and directed by Jim Milio. The film stars Grant Shaud, Maureen Teefy, Anthony Palermo, Will Ferrell, Lisa Wilcox, and Nia Vardalos. The plot focuses on three friends, single on their birthdays, who each bet $2,000 to see who can get a girlfriend and make the relationship last for three months. The film was produced by Affinity Entertainment and MPH Entertainment Productions and distributed by Boulevard Entertainment and IFM Film Associates. The film was released direct-to-disc on March 8, 1997 to mixed reviews.

Plot
A group of men, all single on their birthdays, bet $2,000 each to see who can find a girlfriend  and make the relationship last for three months. In a desperate attempt to find love, Nick begins a relationship with a much older woman and Les begins an affair with a married woman.

Cast
 Grant Shaud as Les 
 Maureen Teefy as Teri 
 Anthony Palermo as Nick 
 Will Ferrell as Al 
 Lisa Wilcox as Judy 
 Nia Vardalos as Iris

Reception
The film has been met with mixed to positive reviews. Christopher Null of Contact Music gave the film a positive review stating, "For a direct-to-video movie, Men Seeking Women is far funnier than it has any right to be..." and "The key to Jim Milio's film is that he lets the three men's stories bouncing around enough to keep you from getting bored." Null also praised the performances of Ferrell and Shaud. In a more negative review, Bilge Ebiri of Rolling Stone criticized Ferrell's character stating, "Ferrell doesn't really get to use any of his talents. Better things were on the horizon. Much better." Nathan Rabin of The A.V. Club criticized the plot and the performances, saying:

"Ingeniously tapping into the well-documented male desire to speedily form life-long monogamous relationships, Men Seeking Women, if nothing else, proves that films about pathetic male lonely hearts can be just as inept and boring as films about pathetic female lonely hearts. Of course, it doesn't help that Men Seeking Women's three leads aren't the least bit sympathetic, or even particularly interesting."

References

External links
 
 

1997 films
American comedy films
Films set in 1997
1997 comedy films
1990s English-language films
1990s American films